Live at The 9:30 Club is an EP album by American singer-songwriter Josh Ritter. It was originally released on a national Record Store Day on April 19, 2008.

Background
It was recorded by National Public Radio. Ritter describes it as a "live mini-album". The EP is eight songs Josh Ritter performed at a sold-out show in Washington DC on October 9, 2007, at the 9:30 Club.

Track listing
All songs written by Josh Ritter.

 Mind's Eye – 2:51
 To the Dogs or Whoever – 3:18
 Rumors – 3:54
 The Temptation of Adam – 4:43
 Right Moves – 4:03
 Real Long Distance – 2:53
 Lawrence, KS – 4:57
 Next to the Last True Romantic (featuring Old School Freight Train) – 4:14

Personnel

Musicians
 Josh Ritter – vocals and guitar
 Austin Nevins – guitar
 Zack Hickman – bass
 Liam Hurley – drums and percussion
 Sam Kassirer – piano

Additional musicians
 Matt Douglas — baritone saxophone
 Josh Carr — tenor saxophone
 Matt Rippetoe — alto saxophone
 Joe Herrera – trumpet

Production
Mixed by Mark Greenhouse
Engineered by Mark Greenhouse
Mastered by Jeff Lipton
Cover Art by Mike Ritter

Irish special edition
A limited special edition was released in Ireland on September 5, 2008. It has two bonus songs, (Wildfires and California) and three bonus videos (Lillian Egypt, Overnight and Real Long Distance) on it.

All bonus material are live recordings from a show in Waterford, Ireland in December 2007.

References

External links
Josh Ritter official website

2008 EPs
Josh Ritter albums